Jesús Fernández may refer to:

Jesús Fernández Vaquero (1953–2021), Spanish schoolteacher and politician
Jesús Fernández (handballer, born 1962), Spanish handball player
Jesús Fernández (handballer, born 1974), Spanish Olympic handball player
Jesús Fernández (basketball) (born 1975), Spanish basketball player
Jesús Fernández (footballer, born 1988), Spanish football player
Jesús Fernández (footballer, born 2000), Spanish football player
Suso (footballer) (Jesús Joaquín Fernández, born 1993), Spanish football player